This is a list of the last known surviving veterans of the First World War (28 July 1914 – 11 November 1918) who lived to 2009 or later, along with the last known veterans for countries that participated in the war. Veterans are defined as people who were members of the armed forces of the combatant nations during the conflict, although some states use other definitions.

Florence Green, a British citizen who served in the Allied armed forces as a Royal Air Force (WRAF) service member, is generally considered to have been the last verified veteran of the war at her death on 4 February 2012, aged 110. The last combat veteran was Claude Choules, who served in the British Royal Navy (and later the Royal Australian Navy) and died 5 May 2011, aged 110. The last veteran who served in the trenches was Harry Patch (British Army), who died on 25 July 2009, aged 111. The last Central Powers veteran, Franz Künstler of Austria-Hungary, died on 27 May 2008 at the age of 107.

The total number of participating personnel is estimated by the Encyclopædia Britannica at 65,038,810. There were approximately 9,750,103 military deaths during the conflict.

Last surviving veterans of each country

Notes

Veterans by country of service – 9 veterans who lived to 2009 or later
On 27 June 2006, the British Government approved a National Memorial Service at Westminster Abbey, to take place after the death of the last known World War I veteran from the United Kingdom. On 11 November 2009, despite the survival to that date of Claude Choules and Florence Green, the commemoration was held following the death of Harry Patch. On 21 November 2006, the House of Commons of Canada approved a state funeral for the last World War I veteran to have served in the Canadian forces, but this was declined by John Babcock.

Likely verifiable - 1 veteran who lived to 2009 or later

Unverified World War I veterans – 4 possible war veterans who lived to 2009 or later
Listed here are the possible veterans who were not verified as a World War I veteran.

World War I era veterans – 8 veterans who lived to 2009 or later
Listed here are those that joined the armed services after the Armistice date, but before the Treaty of Versailles was signed, or where there is debate on their join-date, or whose military service is sometimes viewed as outside the scope of "WWI", but are considered World War I-era veterans by the press or by their respective governments, or served in a related conflict.

Totals – 21 veterans who lived to 2009 or later
 Verified veterans – 9
 Unverified veterans – 4
 World War I-Era veterans – 8

See also
List of last surviving veterans of military insurgencies and wars
List of last surviving veterans of World War II

References

Military personnel of World War I
People of World War I
Last World War I veterans
Surviving
Last World War I veterans
World War I